Jutta Freybe (1917–1971) was a German stage and film actress. She appeared in ten films during the Nazi era, in leading roles.

Her sisters were the writers Johanna Sibelius and Martha Albrand.

Selected filmography
 Love Can Lie (1937)
 Between the Parents (1938)
 Sensationsprozess Casilla (1939)
 Alarm at Station III (1939)
 The Golden Spider (1943)

References

Bibliography 
 Giesen, Rolf. Nazi Propaganda Films: A History and Filmography. McFarland, 2003.

External links 
 

1917 births
1971 deaths
German stage actresses
German film actresses
Actresses from Berlin
20th-century German actresses